The Aberdeen Diversified Income and Growth Trust is an investment trust focusing on investments known to deliver reliable income and growth. It is listed on the London Stock Exchange.

History
The company was founded by accountants, James Ivory and Thomas Watson Sime of the asset management firm, Ivory and Sime, as the British Assets Trust in 1898. After the mandate moved to BlackRock in February 2015, the company changed its name from British Assets Trust to BlackRock Income Strategies Investment Trust in April 2015. Then, after the mandate moved to Aberdeen Asset Management, the company merged with Aberdeen UK Tracker Trust and was renamed Aberdeen Diversified Income and Growth Trust in December 2016.

References

External links
  Official site

Investment trusts of the United Kingdom
1898 establishments in the United Kingdom